Marco Huser (born 12 November 1979) is a Swiss snowboarder. He competed in the men's snowboard cross event at the 2006 Winter Olympics.

References

1979 births
Living people
Swiss male snowboarders
Olympic snowboarders of Switzerland
Snowboarders at the 2006 Winter Olympics
People from the canton of Glarus
21st-century Swiss people